Transtar, Inc. is a subsidiary of US Steel. It was organized in 1988 to own US Steel's railroad and other transportation subsidiaries. In the third quarter of 2021 it will be taken over by Fortress Transportation and Infrastructure Investors.

Transtar owns or has owned the following companies:

References

External links
Transtar

United States railroad holding companies
U.S. Steel